Benzyl gentiobioside is a decyanogenated form of amygdalin. Benzyl gentiobioside occurs in Prunus persica seeds.

References

Benzyl compounds
Glucosides
Disaccharides